Panserraikos Football Club, the All-Serres Football Club, is a Greek football club based in Serres in Central Macedonia, Greece. Panserraikos is one of the most important and well-supported clubs in northern Greece and had a near-continuous presence in the First Division in the 1960s and 70s.

History
Panserraikos was formed in 1946 in Serres, when two local clubs, Apollon and Iraklis, merged. Evangelos Chatziathanasiadis was the first president of Panserraikos, with Angelos Angelousis as honorary president and Theodoros Athanasiadis as vice president. The colors of the club were red and white, which symbolized the great power that came from this historic merger. Leo of Amphipolis was chosen as the brand that showed the strength and warlike virtues of the people of Serrai. Panserraikos participated in the national championships for the first time in the 1964–65 season. Then, they played in the Beta Ethniki, since both Apollon and Iraklis were playing in this category last season. The dynamics of the newly formed club was huge and so Panserraikos immediately won its promotion to the Alpha Ethniki, finishing first with a difference of 11 points from the second MENT.

Since their last relegation in 1992 the club had been struggling in the Beta Ethniki, and were even relegated to the Third Division twice, in 1993 and 1996, yet promptly returning to the second tier on both occasions. The club did come close to promotion a few times, missing out on 5 points in 1998 and on just one point in 2000.

In 2008, Panserraikos managed to end a 16-year wait, gaining promotion to the Greek Super League. Managed by Giannis Papakostas, the club had been leading the Second Division table for the most part of the season, even securing a top-three spot with two games to spare – though they had narrowly escaped another relegation in the previous two seasons.

On 4 March 2009, Panserraikos won a historic match against Panathinaikos in the Olympic Stadium in Athens for the Greek Cup quarter finals with a score of 3–2 after being up 3–0 for 71 minutes. The first match leg ended at a 0–0 score. This amazing result landed Panserraikos a spot in the final 4 of the Greek Cup where they played against AEK Athens for a spot in the finals. What made this result so special was that many starters for the team were either injured, or suspended. This was Panserraikos' first time in the semifinals of the Greek Cup. However, Panserraikos was relegated and played once again in the 2009–10 Beta Ethniki. After an indifferent start to their Beta Ethniki campaign, their season has now sparked into life after a surprise 3–1 win over giants Olympiakos in the Fourth Round of 2009–10 Greek Cup making it one of their bigger wins in recent history.

Panserraikos finished 5th in 2009–10 Beta Ethniki, but took the 1st place in the play-offs and gained the promotion to the 2010–11 Super League. For one more season in Super League Panserraikos didn't escape the relegation to 2011–12 Football League. After a disappointing season, Panserraikos finished 7th in 2011–12 Football League, and played in Football League for the second consecutive season. Panserraikos finished 8th in 2012–13 Football League, but was relegated to the new amateur 3rd Greek Division due to financial problems, after the death of its chairman Petros Theodoridis and a controversial and unsuccessful attempt by his son Lazaros Theodoridis to sell the club to Russian investor Mr. Konstantin Vostrikov, a self-declared business tycoon who was claiming to construct a 10,000-seat stadium. Mr. Vostrikov's faults as president and CEO together with the amateur handlings of his associate Dimitris Troshkov (member of the board) are considered to be the main and only causes of the club's relegation to the amateur 3rd Greek Division.

Crest and colours

The club adopted the Lion of Amphipolis as their emblem, because it is one of the most important monuments in Serres regional unit. Its position is next to the west bank of Strymon, close to the bridge of Strymon. It was restored on a pedestal in the position where it was discovered, after the completion of the excavation. It is an imposing marble lion in a position of a sited wildcat with its paws up. It is erected just outside Nea Kerdylia, on the old national motorway between Thessaloniki and Kavala. According to some archaeologists, the devastation of the monument took place at the end of the 4th century B.C. It is possible that the monument was destroyed by the Roman conquerors, who in order to take it to Rome, they broke it into pieces. However, the most probable version, seems to be the one that the Lion was destroyed by the Bulgarians in 1204 A.C. Many different opinions have been expressed for the purpose or the cause of the monument's construction. The most prevalent one was expressed by the Professor of Archeology, Oscar Broneer who believed that the Lion was erected in honour of Laomedon of Mytilene, son of Larichus and trusty friend of Alexander the Great. French archaeologist J. Roger claimed that the monument was erected in honour of Nearchus, Admiral of Alexander the Great. Finally, according to another version, the Lion of Amfipolis was erected as a symbolic monument, in order to reflect the tower's power, as it happened with the Lions of Delos.

The typical kit of the team is that of a shirt with red and white vertical stripes, and red shorts and socks. The shirt has taken different forms during the history of the club, for example with thin or wider stripes. The second most common kit is the all-red one or the all-white one.

Stadium

The headquarters of Panserraikos are the Serres Municipal Stadium. As its name implies, it belongs to the Municipality of Serres and has been assigned to the group for its needs. It is one of the oldest courts. It was originally built in 1926 and had a dirt terrain, while there was only one ramp on the west side. The capacity at that time did not exceed the 3,000 standing viewers. After 1964 when Panserraikos was basically founded, the team's need for a better pitch became more imperative. It was preceded in 1972 when the Municipal Stadium of Serres had a record audience of 14,200 in a match of Panserraikos with AEL. That year our team competed in the Football League and claimed the rise with the Thessalian team. That game had ended with a 1–1 draw, but Panserraikos was the one who eventually became champion.
In 1976, the stadium took its current form in the stands. This year, work was done to build a turf. The stadium of Serres at that time contained 15,000 upright spectators. The facelift continued in an attempt to hide his age in 2005. It was then that 9,500 plastic seats were placed in all the stands. This brought down its capacity as it was natural. Finally, after years of waiting, headlights were installed.

Players

Current squad

Out on loan

Honours

Greek League
Second Division (4): 1964–65, 1971–72, 1979–80, 2007–08
Third Division (2): 1993–94, 2014–15
Fourth Division (1): 2019–20

Greek Cup
 Semi-finalists of 2008–09 Greek Cup

League history

Sources:

Club records

Record Attendance: 14,200 vs Larissa, Beta Ethniki, 25 June 1972
Record League Home Victory: 6–1 vs AEL Limassol, Alpha Ethniki, 1969
Record League Away Victory: 9–4 vs Levadiakos, Beta Ethniki, 29 March 1998
Highest League Position: 8th in Alpha Ethniki, seasons 1969–1970 and 1980–1981
Lowest League Position: 18th in Alpha Ethniki, season 1979–1980

Notable managers
 Ilie Oană
 Vladimír Táborský
 Ioannis Gounaris
 Christos Archontidis
 Nikos Anastopoulos
 Makis Katsavakis
 Konstantinos Iosifidis
 Dušan Mitošević
 Lajos Détári
 Giannis Papakostas
 Hugo Broos
 Ángel Pedraza
 Guillermo Ángel Hoyos
 Dragan Kokotović
  Momčilo Vukotić
 Josu Uribe
 Michalis Grigoriou
 Kostas Vasilakakis
 Paulo Campos

References

External links

Official website 
Panserraikos' supporters "Che Guevara" club

 
Association football clubs established in 1946
Serres
1946 establishments in Greece
Multi-sport clubs in Greece
Football clubs in Central Macedonia
Super League Greece 2 clubs